Donato Renzetti (born on 30 January 1950) is an Italian conductor. He is the recipient of the 1980 Guido Cantelli Award.

Biography
Renzetti was once a percussionist at Milan's La Scala. He left it to return as a conductor and winner of the Cantelli Award while still a young man.

He conducted "many of the most esteemed orchestras," including the English Chamber Orchestra, London Sinfonietta, London Philharmonic, Philharmonia Orchestra, DSO Berlin, Tokyo Philharmonic, and led operas in such renowned opera houses as the Dallas Opera, Grand Théâtre de Genève, Opéra de Paris, Bayerische Staatsoper and Covent Garden. He made his first appearance at Glyndebourne with Rossini's La Cenerentola, which was acclaimed.

Among his students was 27-year-old Gianandrea Noseda.

References

Italian male conductors (music)
Music & Arts artists
20th-century Italian conductors (music)
21st-century Italian conductors (music)